The Jurassic Astartidae clam erroneously named Oxyloma by Gardner and Campbell in 2002 is now known as Oxyeurax.

Oxyloma is a genus of air-breathing land snails, terrestrial pulmonate gastropod mollusks in the family Succineidae, the ambersnails.

Species
The genus Oxyloma includes the following species and subspecies:

Oxyloma decampi - Marshall ambersnail
Oxyloma deprimidum
Oxyloma elegans (Risso, 1826)
Oxyloma effusum - coastal plain ambersnail
Oxyloma groenlandicum - ruddy ambersnail
Oxyloma hawkinsi - boundary ambersnail
Oxyloma haydeni (W. G. Binney, 1858)
Oxyloma haydeni haydeni (W. G. Binney, 1858) - Niobrara ambersnail
Oxyloma haydeni kanabense (Pilsbry, 1948) - Kanab ambersnail
Oxyloma missoula Hubricht, 1982 - ninepipes ambersnail
Oxyloma nuttallianum - oblique ambersnail
 Oxyloma patentissima (Pfeiffer, 1853)
Oxyloma peoriense - depressed ambersnail
Oxyloma retusum (Lea, 1834) - blunt ambersnail
 Oxyloma sarsii (Esmark & Hoyer, 1886)
Oxyloma salleanum - Louisiana ambersnail
Oxyloma sillimani - Humboldt ambersnail
Oxyloma subeffusum - Chesapeake ambersnail
Oxyloma verrilli - maritime ambersnail

Conservation status
The only Oxyloma species or subspecies listed in the IUCN Red List of 2006 is the Kanab ambersnail (Oxyloma haydeni kanabense), which is critically endangered. No others have been assessed by the IUCN.

The Niobrara ambersnail (Oxyloma haydeni haydeni) is listed as a "Wyoming Species of Greatest Conservation Need" by the Wyoming Game and Fish Department.

References

Succineidae